In the United Kingdom, continuity announcers are people who are employed to introduce programmes on radio and television networks, to promote forthcoming programmes on the station, to cross-promote programmes on the broadcaster's other stations where applicable and, sometimes, to provide information relating to the programme just broadcast.

The six pre-digital terrestrial television channels in the UK (BBC One, BBC Two, ITV, Channel 4, S4C and Channel 5) make use of continuity announcers, and for most of the time, continuity announcements are presented live. Continuity announcers can also be found on digital and satellite channels, but most of these channels make use of pre-recorded announcements.

BBC
The BBC mainly uses live announcers on its flagship television channels BBC One and BBC Two, and mainly uses pre-recorded announcements on its digital channels (apart from BBC News and BBC Parliament, which do not use announcers at all). Separate continuity for BBC One and BBC Two in Scotland, Wales and Northern Ireland is provided by local announcers who also double as transmission directors.

Presently, the only national radio station to use continuity announcers is BBC Radio 4, where many of the announcing staff also act as newsreaders and also introduce the station's Shipping Forecast. Until about 1990, BBC Radio 2 used continuity announcers (separate from newsreaders) for its weekend and evening output, but these have since disappeared. Similarly, BBC Radio 3 has downgraded the former role of its announcers in favour of a new style of presenter. Continuity announcers played a much heavier role on the pre-1967 BBC Home Service, BBC Light Programme and BBC Third Programme (and other services on the last-named's frequency). BBC Radio Scotland discontinued the role of dedicated announcers around 2008. Promotional content is included within programmes, while news bulletins are read by Broadcast Journalists. Announcing staff for BBC Radio Cymru, BBC Radio Ulster and BBC Radio Wales double as newsreaders and technical operators.

Continuity announcements for BBC television channels are broadcast from Red Bee Media at the White City Media Village in West London, with separate continuity teams for the nations of Scotland, Wales and Northern Ireland based in the broadcasting centres in Belfast, Cardiff and Glasgow, providing links for the local variations of BBC One and BBC Two, as well as the BBC Scotland channel.

CBBC and CBeebies continuity now airs from studios at MediaCityUK in Salford Quays – up until September 2011, CBBC presentation was broadcast from a small studio in the East Tower of BBC Television Centre while CBeebies presentation was pre-recorded at Teddington Studios. The announcing team for BBC Radio 4 work from a suite of studios on the 7th floor of Broadcasting House in London.

Historically, BBC announcers mostly spoke with Received Pronunciation, but the range of accents heard has widened considerably in recent years, and the general tone has become more informal.

In-vision continuity

Early continuity
Andrew Martin, an expert from the BBC archives, described continuity announcements as "an essential part of television," which "actually tell us quite a lot about the style, the kind of attitudes of television in their particular era."

In-vision continuity announcers, who appeared on screen between programmes, were a staple part of television broadcasts from the very earliest days of television, because "there was a need for linking material between programmes just to kind of announce them." In the early days of television, it was almost like a variety bill in the theatre... [and when] an item would come on, somebody had to say what it was often listing an entire evening's up-coming programming in one link.

The early announcers became "celebrities in their own right," often receiving considerable amounts of fan mail, as they were among the most recognisable on-screen individuals, appearing every day, at the start of an era when television celebrity was really invented. Early in-vision announcers included Elizabeth Cowell, Leslie Mitchell, formerly a newsreel announcer, and Jasmine Bligh, who famously re-opened the television service in 1946. The early continuity announcers were auditioned, as "they had to look good but they also had to speak well", not solely because of the class divide, but because clear speaking was crucial to their role.

Later continuity
It is believed that in-vision continuity was last used during the peak viewing hours on BBC TV in the early 1960s, with a link into the Eurovision Song Contest 1963 the last-known example of the corporation's use of in-vision continuity (as well as existing out-of-vision continuity) across the national network.

Between the late 1960s and circa 1980, many of the BBC's English regions provided their own continuity on weekday evenings, including in-vision presentation – particularly at closedown. Regional in-vision continuity was still used by BBC South in Southampton, BBC Midlands in Birmingham and BBC North West in Manchester by the time English regional continuity was phased out. From 1998 to 2001, the Northern Ireland regional service on BBC Choice used in-vision continuity links.

Children's continuity
The presentation of children's programmes had in-vision continuity from its instigation until 1965. The best-known children's in-vision continuity face was that of schoolgirl Jennifer Gay, one of the Children's Hour announcers, who introduced such favourites as Muffin the Mule between 1949 and 1953.

In-vision continuity was re-introduced as part of Children's BBC/CBBC) on 9 September 1985. From then until 1994, this came from the main BBC1 continuity suite itself, referred to as "the broom cupboard" and introduced by various presenters including Andy Crane, Andi Peters and Phillip Schofield; Since then, it has come from larger, specialised studios. Children's BBC Scotland used in-vision continuity from 1992 - 1996, but this was omitted in favour of out-of-vision continuity from 1997 - 2000. As of September 2011, presentation for both CBBC and CBeebies originates from the BBC's MediaCityUK studios in Salford Quays, following the BBC Children's department move from London.

Modern continuity
In February 2008, BBC Three introduced in-vision continuity links, in the form of live links with presenter Jose Vanders and recorded links with BBC Three viewers. For a time, the BBC Three website offered viewers the opportunity to record links for programmes. The live in-vision links were dropped after only a few months although live out-of-vision continuity during peak time returned in September 2011.

On 19 September 2008, the Scottish Gaelic-language digital channel BBC Alba launched with in-vision continuity from the channel's sole announcer, Fiona MacKenzie. A second in-vision announcer, Moira MacDonald, was appointed in July 2009. All continuity links are pre-recorded in Stornoway and transmitted from BBC Scotland's headquarters in Glasgow.

ITV
All announcements for ITV plc-owned stations on ITV, UTV and for ITV2, ITV3, ITV4  and ITVBe originate from the company's main transmission facilities at Technicolor in Chiswick. CITV is the only ITV channel not to use continuity announcers.

A separate team of announcers for the separately-owned STV is based at the company's headquarters in Pacific Quay, Glasgow.

Most announcements broadcast on ITV are conducted live, while overnight announcements, regional opt-out continuity and links for ITV2, ITV3 and ITV4 are usually pre-recorded. All of ITV plc's announcers work on a freelance basis.

STV uses live continuity during the evening (between around 5pm and midnight) with daytime announcements pre-recorded by the duty prime time announcer during their shift. STV-branded presentation is used throughout the station's broadcast hours with transmission manned by technical staff in Glasgow 24 hours a day.

The consolidation of ITV companies during the 1990s and 2000s led to the closure of transmission and continuity facilities at some ITV company studios:

In-vision continuity
The use of on screen continuity announcers was common on ITV when each region was run by an independent company with their own transmission and continuity facilities. During the 1980s and 1990s, many regional companies abandoned the use of in-vision continuity announcers:

The only ITV companies which have never used in-vision continuity are Carlton Television (London) which in 2002, Carlton Television became half of ITV London.  and Westcountry Television, who both began broadcasting on 1 January 1993. 

Granada Television, for its first 20 years or so, never used in-vision continuity as its CEO, Sidney Bernstein, considered it frivolous for a station that was trying to match the BBC in image and respectability (despite the BBC employing in-vision announcers at the time of Granada's launch) and felt that having a mere functionary would cheapen the station. This decision was reversed in the late 1970s and early 1980s, following Sidney Bernstein's retirement.

Channel 4
Channel 4 employs continuity announcers on its network of stations; 4seven, Channel 4, E4, Film4 and More4. All announcements come from Red Bee Media at White City Media Village in West London. Since 2009, Red Bee have provided playout facilities for Channel 4. On 4seven, E4 and More4, announcements during evening primetime are now commonly broadcast live, with recorded announcements at other times; most announcements on Channel 4 are live. Announcements for 4Music programming, where used, are usually pre-recorded.

In-vision continuity
Channel 4 used links featuring the announcer on-screen for a brief period following its launch in 1982, mainly at closedown. The station briefly reprised the use of in-vision continuity links for a short period from 1996, used mainly in evening transmissions.

S4C
S4C announcers provide live out-of-vision continuity links from New Broadcasting House, Cardiff.

In-vision continuity
S4C used in-vision continuity throughout broadcast hours from launch in November 1982 until around 1991.

In-vision presentation continues to be used during S4C's children strands, Cyw (for young children) and Stwnsh (for older children). Stwnsh links are mostly conducted live whereas Cyw links are mostly pre-recorded. Characters and presenters from S4C's Cyw output occasionally appear to provide continuity links.

Children's presentation is produced by independent production companies Boomerang (Stwnsh/Cyw in-vision links) and Cwmni Da (Cyw).

Channel 5
Channel 5 use announcers on its network of stations; 5*, 5USA, 5Action, 5Select and Channel 5. All announcements come from Channel 5's transmission facility in London.

In-vision continuity
Channel 5 has only used on-screen announcers as part of its children's strand, Milkshake! which comes from studios at Hawley Crescent, London.

Sky Showcase
Sky Showcase out-of-vision continuity is broadcast live in the evening with pre-recorded links broadcast during the day and overnight.

Sky Witness
Sky Witness out-of-vision continuity is live, as of January 2016.

Sky Movies
Sky Movies out-of-vision continuity is live, since January 2016.

See also
 List of continuity announcers in the United Kingdom

References

Radio in the United Kingdom
Broadcasting in the United Kingdom
United Kingdom
Television presentation in the United Kingdom